The women's 1500 metres race of the 2015–16 ISU Speed Skating World Cup 5, arranged in the Sørmarka Arena in Stavanger, Norway, was held on 30 January 2016.

Martina Sáblíková of the Czech Republic won the race, while Brittany Bowe of the United States came second, and Marrit Leenstra of the Netherlands came third. Olga Graf of Russia won the Division B race.

Results
The race took place on Friday, 29 January, with Division B scheduled in the morning session, at 10:29, and Division A scheduled in the afternoon session at 15:45.

Division A

Division B

References

Women 1500
5